Silver Creek High School is a high school located in the Evergreen district of San Jose, California, United States, which is operated by the East Side Union High School District. It is a California Distinguished School.

Demographics
As of 2014–2015, the school enrolls 2,465 students. The 2015 population is 56% Asian (Pacific Islander included), 36% Hispanic, 5% White, 2% African American, and 1% other.

Notable alumni
Boris Bandov, 1971 was a former pro soccer player with San Jose Earthquakes
Eldon Regua, 1973, Major General, United States Army Reserve, currently Deputy Commanding General, US Eighth Army, Yongsan, Korea, completed tour as Commanding General, 75th Division (Training)
Millard Hampton 1974, competed in the 1976 Montreal Olympics with a gold medal in the 4 × 100 m relay, and a silver medal in the 200 m.
Andre Phillips 1977, won a gold medal at the 1988 Olympic Games in the 400-meter hurdles.
Anthony Telford 1984, SJSU All American drafted in 1987 to the Orioles and played in the MLB until 2002.
Pellom McDaniels 1986, played professional football for ten seasons: Birmingham Fire (World League of American Football)1991–92; Kansas City Chiefs, 1992–1998; Atlanta Falcons, 1999–2000.

See also
Santa Clara County high schools

References

External links

East Side Union High School District website

East Side Union High School District
High schools in San Jose, California
Public high schools in California
1969 establishments in California